Walter of Compiègne was a French poet who lived in the middle of the 12th century and was a monk at Saint Martin's at Tours. He composed a Latin biography of Muhammad in elegiac couplets.

The story of Mahomet reached Walter by oral tradition, according to the information he himself provides. Its source was a young Muslim who was brought to France after the First Crusade by a French knight, and who converted to Christianity. Paganus told it to Warner, abbot of the monastery at Tours, and Warner told it to Walter of Compiègne. (Poetic Pastimes on Muhammad) may be given as its title. The poem begins:

Notes

Bibliography
F. J. E. Raby, A History of Secular Latin Poetry in the Middle Ages (Oxford: Clarendon Press, 1934. ) vol. 2 pp. 82–83.

French poets
12th-century Latin writers
Cultural depictions of Muhammad
12th-century deaths
French Christian monks
Year of birth unknown
Year of death unknown
French male poets